Rasteh Kenar may refer to:
 Rasteh Kenar, Fuman
 Rasteh Kenar, Rasht
 Rasteh Kenar, Shaft
 Rasteh Kenar, Khomam, Rasht County
 Rasteh Kenar, Sowme'eh Sara